Defending champions Juan Sebastián Cabal and Robert Farah successfully defended their title, defeating Kevin Krawietz and Horia Tecău in the final, 6–4, 6–2, to win the doubles tennis title at the 2021 Barcelona Open. The top seeds did not drop a set en route to their 18th career ATP Tour doubles title together. Krawietz and Tecău were in contention to win their first title as a team.

Seeds

Draw

Draw

Qualifying

Seeds

Qualifiers
  Adrian Mannarino /  Benoît Paire

Qualifying draw

References

External links
 Main Draw
 Qualifying Draw

Barcelona Open Banc Sabadell - Doubles